The Catholic Church in Ukraine comprises

 one Latin ecclesiastical province headed by the Metropolitan archbishop of Lviv, with 6 suffragan dioceses each headed by a bishop
 a more extensive hierarchy of the Eastern Catholic consisting of 
 a large Ukrainian Catholic Church sui iuris (Byzantine Rite) 
 additional dioceses of Ruthenian Catholics (also Byzantine rite) and Armenian Catholics (Armenian Rite).

There are no pre-diocesan or other exempt Latin Church jurisdictions.

There is an Apostolic Nunciature to Ukraine as papal diplomatic representation (embassy-level), in the national capital Kyiv.

Episcopal Conference of Ukraine

Current Byzantine (Greek) Catholic (Arch)Eparchies

Ukrainian Greek Catholic Metropolitanates 
 Ukrainian Catholic Major Archeparchy of Kyiv–Halych, the Major Archeparchy and head of the particular church
Ukrainian Catholic Archeparchy of Kyiv, the proper Metropolitan Archeparchy, at Kyiv
Ukrainian Catholic Archiepiscopal Exarchate of Crimea (Krym), on the Russian-annexed Crimea, with cathedral see at Simferopol
Ukrainian Catholic Archiepiscopal Exarchate of Donetsk
Ukrainian Catholic Archiepiscopal Exarchate of Kharkiv
Ukrainian Catholic Archiepiscopal Exarchate of Lutsk
Ukrainian Catholic Archiepiscopal Exarchate of Odessa
 Ukrainian Catholic Archeparchy of Lviv (Metropolitan Archeparchy)
Ukrainian Catholic Eparchy of Stryi
Ukrainian Catholic Eparchy of Sambir – Drohobych
Ukrainian Catholic Eparchy of Sokal – Zhovkva
 Ukrainian Catholic Archeparchy of Ternopil – Zboriv (Metropolitan Archeparchy)
Ukrainian Catholic Eparchy of Buchach
Ukrainian Catholic Eparchy of Kamyanets-Podilskyi
 Ukrainian Catholic Archeparchy of Ivano-Frankivsk (Metropolitan Archeparchy)
Ukrainian Catholic Eparchy of Chernivtsi
Ukrainian Catholic Eparchy of Kolomyia

Ruthenian Greek Catholic 
(Byzantine rite)
 Greek Catholic Eparchy of Mukachevo, directly dependent on the Holy See.

Current Latin Dioceses

Ecclesiastical province of Lviv 

 Metropolitan Archdiocese of Lviv (1375–1945, 1991–)
Diocese of Kyiv-Zhytomyr (1320–1925 as diocese of Kyiv (Zhytomyr), 1991–)
Diocese of Kamyanets-Podilskyi
Diocese of Lutsk
Diocese of Mukachevo
Diocese of Kharkiv-Zaporizhzhia
Diocese of Odessa-Simferopol

Note that, even though Crimea was annexed by the Russian Federation in March 2014, this is not taken into account by the Catholic hierarchy. The Latin Church Catholics of Crimea therefore belong to the Diocese of Odessa-Simferopol which is a suffragan of the Archdiocese of Lviv.

Current Armenian Catholic Jurisdiction 
(Armenian rite)
 exempt Armenian Catholic Ordinariate of Eastern Europe, directly dependent on the Holy See
 Armenian Catholic Archeparchy of Lviv, directly dependent on the Armenian Catholic Patriarchate of Cilicia

Former jurisdictions 
Former jurisdictions without current successor sees are :
TO BE CHECKED/COMPLETED

Titular sees 
(all Latin Church)
TO BE WIKIFIED
 Metropolitan Titular archbishoprics : Archdiocese of Sugdaea (Sugdæa)
 Archiepiscopal : Archdiocese of Bosporus, Chersonesus in Zechia, Archdiocese of Phulli
 Episcopal titular bishoprics : Diocese of Caffa, Diocese of Cembalo, Diocese of Soldaia

Other Defunct Latin 
 Roman Catholic Archdiocese of Halyč (Galicia)
 Roman Catholic Diocese of Lodomeria
 Roman Catholic Diocese of Zhytomyr

Defunct Eastern Catholic 
 Ukrainian Catholic Eparchy of Lutsk–Ostroh 
 Ukrainian Catholic Eparchy of Volodymyr–Brest
 Ukrainian Catholic Eparchy of Zboriv 
 Ukrainian Catholic Apostolic Exarchate of Volhynia, Polesia and Pidliashia
 Ukrainian Catholic Apostolic Exarchate of Łemkowszczyzna (not in Ukrainian territory nor serving Ukrainians, rather Lemko people)

See also 
 List of Catholic dioceses (structured view)

References

Sources and external links 
 GCatholic.org - data for all sections
 Catholic-Hierarchy entry

Ukraine
Catholic dioceses